Elizabeth Helen McRae  (née Kersley; born 1 August 1936) is a New Zealand actress, best known for her portrayal of Marjorie Brasch (née Neilson) in the television soap opera Shortland Street, and, in the last decade, as Jean Marlowe, in the internationally distributed TV series The Brokenwood Mysteries.

Biography
Born in Wellington in 1936, McRae was educated at Wellington Girls' College from 1950 to 1954 and was head prefect in her final year. She graduated from Victoria University College with a Bachelor of Arts degree in 1958, and married architect Don McRae in Wellington the following year. The couple's children include actress, scriptwriter and director Katherine McRae.

Her first theatrical role was in Nola Millar's 1955 production of Richard II at Wellington's Unity Theatre, which also featured Tim Eliott in his acting debut.

McRae made her television debut on the NZBC in the children's mini-series The Games Affair in 1974, and went on to appear in many other New Zealand television programmes including Mortimer's Patch, Mercy Peak, Terry and the Gunrunners, and Go Girls. However, it is for her recurring role as receptionist-turned-MP Marjorie Brasch on the long-running New Zealand television soap opera Shortland Street that she is most well-known. McRae played the role from the soap's first episode in 1992, speaking the show's first line, until 1996, with further appearances in 1998, 2002, and on the 20th anniversary episode in 2012.

McRae's film acting credits include Never Say Die (1988), An Angel at My Table (1990), 30 Days of Night (2006) and, in 2010, Rest for the Wicked, in which she played the lead role of Lillian.

McRae was named best actress in a radio drama production at the 1982 Mobil New Zealand Radio Awards, and was appointed an Officer of the New Zealand Order of Merit, for services to theatre, in the 2006 Queen's Birthday Honours.

Filmography

Film

Television

References

External links
 

1936 births
Living people
Actresses from Wellington City
People educated at Wellington Girls' College
Victoria University of Wellington alumni
New Zealand television actresses
New Zealand film actresses
New Zealand stage actresses
New Zealand voice actresses
New Zealand soap opera actresses
Officers of the New Zealand Order of Merit
20th-century New Zealand actresses
21st-century New Zealand actresses